Tuna bun, Tuna fish bun is a Hong Kong-style fish bun. It is a bun that contains tuna paste. It is commonly found in Hong Kong.

Due to the high price of a whole tuna, almost all bakeries in Hong Kong use canned tuna to make tuna buns.

See also 
 Tuna fish sandwich
 List of buns

References

External links 
 MyTravelFoods

Hong Kong breads